Muang Loei United Football Club (Thai สโมสรฟุตบอลเมืองเลย ยูไนเต็ด), is a Thai football club based in Mueang, Loei, Thailand. The club was the champion in the 2016 Football Division 3 of North Eastern Region and was promoted to Thai League 4 North Eastern Region. The club was formed in 2012 and entered the Thai Football Division 3 in 2016. The club was renamed from Wang Saphung Football Club. The club is currently playing in the Thai League 3 Northeastern region.

Stadium and locations

Records

Matches
 First match 
 vs. Petchchaiyapruek F.C., Drew 0–0, Ngor Royal Cup, Nong Chok Sport Stadium, 20 January 2015
 First League Match 
 vs. Mashare Chaiyaphum F.C., Lost 0–1, Thai League 4, Wang Saphung Stadium (H), 12 February 2017
 First Thai League Cup Match
 vs. Uttaradit F.C., Win 2–0, Wang Saphung Stadium (H), 1 March 2017
 Record win (all competitions)
 6–0 (against TWD Tanaytum, Football Division 3 North Eastern Zone Final Round, Wang Saphung Stadium (H), 28 December 2016) 
 7–1 (against Mahasarakham F.C., Thai League 4, Wang Saphung Stadium (H), 9 September 2016)
 Record League win 
 7–1 (against Mahasarakham F.C., Thai League 4, Wang Saphung Stadium (H), 9 September 2016)
 Record defeat (all competitions)
 0–3 (against Nakhon Pathom Municipality Sport School, Ngor Royal Cup Final Round, Thephasadin Stadium, 20 February 2015)
 Record League defeat 
 2–0 (against Huai Thalaeng United F.C., Thai League 4, Surapala Greetasathan (A), 8 July 2017)
 0–2 (against Mashare Chaiyaphum F.C., Thai League 4, Wang Saphung Stadium (H), 19 July 2017)

Attendance
 Highest home attendance
 1,010 vs. Loei City F.C., Thai League 4, 10 May 2017

Player records
 First player to score a League goal
 Miguel Kamwa Ngueyu  : vs. Buriram United F.C. B, Thai League 4, 26 February 2017, Wang Saphung Stadium

Season by season record

Players

Current squad

Out on loan

Club staff

Honours

Domestic leagues
 Thai League 3 North Eastern Region
 Winners (1): 2021–22
 Thai League 4 North Eastern Region
 Winners (2): 2018, 2019
 Football Division 3
 Winners (1): 2016

References

External links
 Official Facebook page

Association football clubs established in 2012
Football clubs in Thailand
Sport in Loei province
2012 establishments in Thailand